Fernando Talaverano Gallegos, also known as Hernando Talaverano (1563, Spain – 1619, Chile); lawyer and Spanish administrator, occupied the position of temporary governor of Chile for ten months after the death of Alonso de Ribera, between March 1617 and January 1618.

Sources

1563 births
1619 deaths
Royal Governors of Chile